This is the results breakdown of the local elections held in the Canary Islands on 22 May 2011. The following tables show detailed results in the autonomous community's most populous municipalities, sorted alphabetically.

Overall

City control
The following table lists party control in the most populous municipalities, including provincial capitals (shown in bold). Gains for a party are displayed with the cell's background shaded in that party's colour.

Municipalities

Arona
Population: 79,377

Las Palmas de Gran Canaria
Population: 383,308

San Cristóbal de La Laguna
Population: 152,222

Santa Cruz de Tenerife
Population: 222,643

Telde
Population: 100,900

Island Cabildos

See also
2011 Canarian regional election

References

Canary Islands
2011